The Nauyat Formation is a Neoproterozoic-Mesoproterozoic geologic formation located on northwestern Baffin Island, Nunavut, Canada. It consists of a series of continental flood basalt lava flows of the Mackenzie Large Igneous Province with a thickness of at least . These volcanic rocks range in age from 762 to 1,221 million years old.

See also
Volcanology of Canada
Volcanology of Eastern Canada
Volcanology of Northern Canada
Volcanology of Western Canada

References

Volcanism of Nunavut
Mesoproterozoic volcanism
Neoproterozoic volcanism
Flood basalts
Hotspot volcanism
Mackenzie Large Igneous Province